The peninsula cooter (Pseudemys peninsularis) is a species of freshwater turtle in the genus Pseudemys. It is sometimes considered a subspecies of the coastal plain cooter (P. floridana) when that turtle is not itself considered a subspecies of the river cooter (P. concinna).

Description
The peninsula cooter is an average sized member of the family Emydidae, typically reaching carapace lengths of 9-13 in (23-33 cm) and weights of 5-15 lbs (2.27-6.8 kg). However, they are capable of surpassing 16” (40.64cm) and 35 pounds (15.876 kg). Peninsula cooters can be distinguished from the Florida red-bellied cooter (Pseudemys nelsoni) by their lack of a reddish plastron and the presence of dozens of yellow stripes on their carapace, limbs, head, and tail. Males can be distinguished from females by not only their smaller size, but their greatly elongated front claws. These claws are used to stimulate the female prior to mating.

Distribution
The species is widespread in peninsular Florida. It can be found in rivers, ponds, and lakes.

References

Bibliography

Pseudemys
Reptiles described in 1938